Sebastian David Fitzek (born 13 October 1971 in West-Berlin) is a German writer and journalist. His first book, Therapy (dt. ), was a bestseller in Germany in 2006, toppling The Da Vinci Code from the first position. Fitzek is currently one of the most successful writers of Germany.

Biography 
Sebastian Fitzek was born in West Berlin, West Germany and grew up with his father, headmaster of the Lilienthal-Gymnasium in Berlin-Lichterfelde, and his mother, a teacher. After High school in Charlottenburger Wald-Gymnasium, Fitzek started studying veterinary, but stopped after 3 months. He attended law school until the first state examination, earned his degree in copyright and worked then as editor-in-chief and program director for different radio stations in Germany.

He wrote his first book titled Professor Udolphs Buch der Namen with Jürgen Udolph, which came out in 2005. Since 2006, Fitzek started to write psycho-thriller novels, which all became a best-seller. His very first novel was Therapy (dt. ). He got his idea for Therapy in 2000, waiting for a friend in a waiting room from a orthopedist. After 13 cancellations from different editors, he finally released his book in July 2006 under Droemer Knaur Verlag. The Odeon Film AG bought the movie rights for Therapy. In 2007, Therapy was nominated for best crime-debut for the Friedrich-Glauser-Award. His next novel, Amok game. (dt. ), was released in 2007 and Goldkind Film AG bought the movie rights for it. In 2012, his very first film version of The Child (dt. ) came out.

On 29 October 2016, he published his book The Package (dt. ).

In 2017, he published EightNight. (dt. ) and his first children's book called Pupsi & Stinki together with illustrator Jörn Stollmann. In 2017, EightNight was the bestselling work of fiction in Germany.

In 2018, The Package was the bestselling work of fiction in Germany. The Undercover Patient (dt. ) peaked at number 3.

End of February 2018, he created the Viktor Crime Awards, where a new voice for thriller and crime literature will be awarded. The first winner was writer Michaela Kastel with So dark the forest (dt. ).

In November 2020 The Package was published in English by Head of Zeus, translated by Jamie Bulloch.

Influences 
According to Fitzek himself, he was inspired by Enid Blyton, Michael Ende and Alfred Weidemann during his childhood and later by Stephen King, Michael Crichton and John Grisham. Today, he reads everything written by Harlan Coben.

Personal life 
Sebastian Fitzek lives in Berlin. He married his wife in 2010. In August 2019, he announced his separation from his wife via Facebook. Fitzek has 3 children.

Works

Fiction (Psychothriller)

Fiction (Collaboration)

Non-Fiction

Audio books

Film versions

Film

Theater shows

Board and card games

Awards and nominations

References

External links
Sebastian Fitzek Website

Living people
1971 births
German male writers
!